Andriy Anatoliyovych Sidelnikov (born 27 September 1967) is a retired Soviet Union and Ukrainian football player.

Honours
 Soviet Premier League winner: 1988.
 Soviet Premier League runner-up: 1989.
 Soviet Cup winner: 1989.
 K-League third place: 1996.
 1990 UEFA European Under-21 Football Championship winner.

International career
Sidelnikov made his debut for Soviet Union on 23 November 1990 in a friendly against Trinidad and Tobago.

Club career 
1984–1985 Dnipro Dnipropetrovsk
1986 Dynamo-D Kyiv
1987–1991 Dnipro Dnipropetrovsk
1992–1994 Wattenscheid 09
1995–1996 Chunnam Dragons
1997 CSKA Moscow
1998 Dnipro Dnipropetrovsk
1999 Kapaz Gäncä

References
 Profile

External links
 
 
 

1967 births
Living people
People from Rovenky
Association football defenders
Russian footballers
Soviet footballers
Ukrainian footballers
Ukrainian expatriate footballers
Soviet Union under-21 international footballers
Soviet Union international footballers
FC Kryvbas Kryvyi Rih players
FC Dnipro players
FC Dynamo Kyiv players
SG Wattenscheid 09 players
Jeonnam Dragons players
PFC CSKA Moscow players
Soviet Top League players
Bundesliga players
K League 1 players
Russian Premier League players
Ukrainian Premier League players
Expatriate footballers in Germany
Expatriate footballers in South Korea
Expatriate footballers in Russia
Expatriate footballers in Azerbaijan
Ukrainian expatriate sportspeople in Germany
Ukrainian expatriate sportspeople in South Korea
Ukrainian expatriate sportspeople in Russia
Ukrainian expatriate sportspeople in Azerbaijan
Sportspeople from Luhansk Oblast